Quintilia carinata (Thunberg, 1822) is a species of Cicada occurring in South Africa.

References

External links
'Successful identification of the final instar nymph of Quintilia carinata by DNA extraction from the exuviae'
Catalogue of the Cicadoidea (Hemiptera: Auchenorrhyncha) -Allen F. Sanborn

Malagasiini
Cicadidae genera